Pieter Van Dieven, Latinized Petrus Divaeus (1535–1581) was a 16th-century scholar who wrote on the history of Belgic Gaul, the charters and liberties of the city of Leuven, and the history of the duchy of Brabant. Most of his work was issued in print only after his death.

Life
Divaeus was born in Leuven in 1536, and served as clerk of the city council. Appointed pensionary of Mechelen, he died there in 1581.

Writings
De Galliae Belgicae Antiquitatibus (Antwerp, 1566)
Rerum Brabanticarum Libri XIX, edited by Aubertus Miraeus (Antwerp, 1610)
Opera Varia, edited by Jean-Noël Paquot (Leuven, 1757), containing:
Rerum Lovaniensium Libri quatuor
Annalium Oppidi Lovaniensis Libri Octo
Commentarius de Statu Belgiae sub Franciae imperio

References

1535 births
1581 deaths
Writers from Leuven
Habsburg Netherlands historians